The Battle of Hefei was fought between the contending states of Cao Wei and Eastern Wu in 233 during the Three Kingdoms period of China.

Background
In 230, the Cao Wei state constructed a new fortress at Hefei to defend against its rival state of Wu. The fortress is referred to as "Xincheng" (新城; literally: "new city/fortress") in historical sources.

The battle
In 233, the Wu emperor Sun Quan led an army across the Yangtze River to attack Xincheng. However, as the fortress was located very inland, Sun Quan's forces remained on their ships for more than 20 days. Man Chong, the Wei general defending Xincheng, secretly sent 6,000 infantry and cavalry to wait in ambush near the river. When Sun Quan's forces set foot on land, they were suddenly attacked by the Wei army lying in ambush. Hundreds of Wu soldiers were killed while others drowned in the river as they attempted to flee. Sun Quan ordered a retreat after his defeat. He later sent Quan Cong to attack Lu'an, but Quan was unsuccessful and withdrew as well.

References

 Chen, Shou (3rd century). Records of the Three Kingdoms (Sanguozhi).
 Pei, Songzhi (5th century). Annotations to Records of the Three Kingdoms (Sanguozhi zhu).
 Sima, Guang (1084). Zizhi Tongjian.

233
Hefei 233
Military history of Anhui
Hefei
230s conflicts